A special-use domain name is a domain name that is defined and reserved in the hierarchy of the Domain Name System of the Internet for special purposes. The designation of a reserved special-use domain is authorized by the Internet Engineering Task Force (IETF) and executed, maintained, and published by the Internet Assigned Numbers Authority (IANA).

Reserved domain names
The following list comprises the domain names list by IANA in the category of special-use domain names.

See also

 Reserved top-level domains

References

Domain Name System
Placeholder names
Internet properties established in 1999